is an art museum in Tadaoka, Osaka Prefecture, Japan, that opened in 1968.

Gallery

See also
 Fujita Art Museum
 Kubosō Memorial Museum of Arts, Izumi
 List of National Treasures of Japan (writings: others)
 Bokuseki

References

External links
  Masaki Art Museum
  Masaki Art Museum

Art museums and galleries in Osaka Prefecture
Tadaoka, Osaka
Art museums established in 1968
1968 establishments in Japan